Azimiyeh Rural District is in the Central District of Ray County, Tehran province, Iran. At the National Census of 2006, its population was 65,133 in 16,201 households. There were 61,810 inhabitants in 17,325 households at the following census of 2011. At the most recent census of 2016, the population of the rural district was 55,564 in 16,505 households. The largest of its 13 villages was Alayin, with 21,594 people.

References 

Ray County, Iran

Rural Districts of Tehran Province

Populated places in Tehran Province

Populated places in Ray County, Iran